Contextual advertising is a form of targeted advertising for advertisements appearing on websites or other media, such as content displayed in mobile browsers. In context targeting, advertising media are controlled on the basis of the content of a website using linguistic elements. The advertisements themselves are selected and served by automated systems based on the context of what a user is looking at.

How it works
A contextual advertising system scans the text of a website for keywords and returns advertisements to the webpage based on those keywords. The advertisements may be displayed on the webpage as pop-up ads. For example, if the user is viewing a website pertaining to sports and that website uses contextual advertising, the user may see advertisements for sports-related companies, such as memorabilia dealers or ticket sellers. Contextual advertising is also used by search engines to display advertisements on their search results pages based on the keywords in the user's query.

Contextual advertising is a form of targeted advertising in which the content of an ad is in direct correlation to the content of the web page the user is viewing. An example of contextual advertising is an ad offering a special price on a flight to Italy appearing on a website concerning traveling in Europe. Contextual advertising is also called "In-Text" advertising or "In-Context" technology.

Apart from that when a visitor doesn't click on the ad in a go through time (a minimum time a user must click on the ad) the ad is automatically changed to next relevant ad showing the option below of going back to the previous ad.

Contextual ads are less irritating than traditional advertising. That is why it influences user more effectively. It shows user area of interest thus increasing the chance of receiving a response.

Service providers
Google AdSense was the first major contextual advertising network. It works by providing webmasters with JavaScript code that, when inserted into webpages, displays relevant advertisements from the Google inventory of advertisers. The relevance is calculated by a separate Googlebot, that indexes the content of a webpage. Recent technology/service providers have emerged with more sophisticated systems that use language-independent proximity pattern matching algorithm to increase matching accuracy.

Media.net is the other major contextual ad network competing with Google AdSense.

Impact
Contextual advertising has made a major impact on earnings of many websites. Because the advertisements are more targeted, they are more likely to be clicked, thus generating revenue for the owner of the website (and the server of the advertisement).

Contextual advertising has attracted some controversy through the use of techniques such as third-party hyperlinking, where a third-party installs software onto a user's computer that interacts with the web browser. Keywords on a webpage are displayed as hyperlinks that lead to advertisers.

With advertisers and marketers focusing on Brand Safety and Suitability, contextual advertising plays a role in protecting a brand's value. Brand positioning and contextual advertising are directly correlated to user perceptions so it is important for marketers to protect their brands by using appropriate contexts.

Agency roles
There are several advertising agencies that help brands understand how contextual advertising options affect their advertising plans. There are three main components to online advertising:
 creation—what the advertisement looks like
 media planning—where the advertisements are to be run; also known as "placements"
 media buying—how the advertisements are paid for
Contextual advertising replaces the media planning component. Instead of humans choosing placement options, that function is replaced with computers facilitating the placement across thousands of websites.

Notes

Further references

 

 
Advertising
Online advertising methods